The Ljubljana Bank was a bank named after and based in Ljubljana, then the capital of the SR Slovenia in SFR Yugoslavia.

Croatia–Slovenia relations
Its liquidation in the early 1990s, after Slovenia declared independence, caused significant damage to the relations between Slovenia and Croatia. In 1994, the Nova Ljubljanska banka was formed with its assets, but not its liabilities. This left many of its former clients without money; the Slovenian ones filed lawsuits that were ended by 1998, but around 130,000 savers in Croatia and 165,000 in Bosnia and Herzegovina remain.

In 2003 The Parliamentary Assembly of the Council of Europe (PACE) was asked to express an opinion on "The repayment of the deposits of foreign exchange made in the offices of the Ljubljanska Banka not on the territory of Slovenia, 1977-1991". This led to a report by the Legal Committee of the PACE (doc. PA number 10135, 14 April 2004), which was accepted by the PACE after a debate in June 2004. The rapporteur, professor E.C.M.Jurgens (Neth.,Soc.)member of the Legal Committee, mentions that the non-repayment of the foreign exchange deposits has caused severe hardship to many ordinary savers. However, the complicated consequences of state succession — after the dissolution of the former Socialist Federal Republic of Yugoslavia — as to the responsibility of the successor states, together with the unclear relation of regional offices of the LB in other former republics of the federation vis a vis the head office of the LB, made it difficult for the PACE to take sides on the legal issues involved.

European Court of Human Rights
The European Court of Human Rights decided on individual applications in 2008 (Kovačić and others v. Slovenia) and 2014 (Ališić and others v. Bosnia and Herzegovina, Croatia, Serbia, Slovenia and the former Yugoslav Republic of Macedonia) and will have to decide an interstate case Slovenia v. Croatia

References

Banks of Slovenia
Croatia–Slovenia relations
European Court of Human Rights cases involving Croatia
European Court of Human Rights cases involving Slovenia